Delaware Park is an unincorporated community and census-designated place (CDP) located within Lopatcong Township, in Warren County, New Jersey, United States, that was created as part of the 2010 United States Census. As of the 2010 Census, the CDP's population was 700.

Geography
According to the United States Census Bureau, the CDP had a total area of 0.246 square miles (0.637 km2), all of which was land.

Demographics

Census 2010

References 

Census-designated places in Warren County, New Jersey
Lopatcong Township, New Jersey